Usaburō Chisaki II (January 2, 1897 – June 29, 1951) was a Japanese businessman and politician. He was a member of the House of Representatives of Japan under the Empire of Japan. He was the father of Usaburō Chisaki III.

Works
『間宮海峡埋立論』（北方文化出版社, 1946年）

Bibliography
高木正雄『北海道建設人物事典』（自費出版, 2008年）

References

1897 births
1951 deaths
20th-century Japanese businesspeople
Members of the House of Representatives (Empire of Japan)
Akita University alumni
People from Sapporo